The 2008 African Handball Champions League was the 30th edition, organized by the African Handball Confederation, under the auspices of the International Handball Federation, the handball sport governing body. The tournament was held from November 27 to December 6, 2008, at the Complexe sportif Mohammed V in Casablanca, Morocco, contested by 13 teams and won by Groupement Sportif des Pétroliers of Algeria.

Draw

Preliminary round 

Times given below are in WET UTC+0.

Group A

Group B

Group C

* Note:  Advance to quarter-finals Relegated to 9-12th classification

Knockout stage

Championship bracket

5-8th bracket

9-12th bracket

Final ranking

Awards

References

External links
 Official website

African Handball Champions League
African Handball Champions League
African Handball Champions League
2008 Africa Handball Champions League
International handball competitions hosted by Morocco
Events in Yaoundé